Chronicle Security is a cybersecurity company which is part of the Google Cloud Platform. Chronicle is a cloud service, built as a specialized layer on top of core Google infrastructure, designed for enterprises to privately retain, analyze, and search the massive amounts of security and network telemetry they generate. 

The company began as a product by X, but became its own company in January 2018. Chronicle creates tools for businesses to prevent cybercrime on their platforms. Chronicle announced "Backstory" at RSA 2019 in March, adding log capture and analysis to the family of products that include VirusTotal, and UpperCase which provide threat intelligence (Known Malicious IPs and URLs). Backstory claims to "Extract signals from your security telemetry to find threats instantly," by combining log data with threat intelligence.

In June 2019 Thomas Kurian announced that Chronicle would be merged into Google Cloud.

Backstory and VirusTotal are now offered to Google Cloud customers as part of an Autonomic Security Operations solution that also includes Looker and BigQuery.

References 

Google Cloud
American companies established in 2018
Software companies established in 2018
2018 establishments in California
Computer security companies